Jaishree Odin is a literary scholar who is the director and a professor of the Program of Interdisciplinary Studies at the University of Hawaii. Her research relates to cultural studies of science and technology, literary and political ecology, ecology and ethics, system's ecology, and eco-literacy. Her work ranges from German philosophy and the feminist angle to mysticism.  She has also considered the current relevance of Shaivite theories of higher consciousness.

Jaishree is sister of computer scientists Avinash Kak and Subhash Kak.

Education and Career
Odin obtained a Master of Science degree in Chemistry from India, following which she went on to earn a doctorate in comparative literature from the State University of New York at Stony Brook.

Odin teaches in the Liberal Studies program at the University of Hawaii. Besides, she is the director of a Sloan foundation-funded online distance learning project at the university, which is intended to increase access to higher education in the state of Hawaii.

Works

Translations 
She is one of the translators of Lalleshvari, the famed 14th century Kashmiri mystic and poet. She has also translated Kashmir's early Sufi poetry, especially that of Nunda Reshi. Odin's essays have been published in Commonwealth Studies and in the collection Postcolonialism and American Ethnicity.

Electronic Literature 
Odin wrote To the Other Shore: Lalla's Life and Poetry (Vitasta Pub, 1999).

Odin's work includes Through the Looking Glass: Technology, Nomadology and Postmodern Narrative which the Electronic Literature State of the Arts Symposium describes as a critical exploration of shattered visual metaphors in contemporary literature which includes electronic literary forms. 

Odin has written extensively on technology-mediated narrative forms as well as the role of technology in re-visioning higher education. Some of her published articles on electronic literature have dealt with the potential of the electronic media in depicting contemporary experience in multiple ways. Ponzanesi and Koen claim: "As Jaishree Odin has so aptly written, both the hypertext and the postcolonial are discourses are characterized by multivocality, multilinearity, open-endedness, active encounter and traversal. Both disrupt chronological sequences and spatial ordering (1997), allowing for a contestation of master narratives and the creation of subaltern positioning."

Odin's work includes critical exploration of shattered visual metaphors in contemporary literature

Awards 
For her work, she has been awarded various awards and grants, including a Fulbright Research Fellowship, the Alfred Sloan Foundation award and UH Relations Research Award.

Bibliography 
Computers and Cultural Transformation. University of Hawaii at Manoa (1997).
"The Edge of Difference: Negotiations Between the Hypertextual and the Postcolonial ". MFS Modern Fiction Studies 3 (43): 1997. pp. 598–630
Globalization and Higher Education. Manoa: University of Hawaii (2004). 
Hypertext and the Female Imaginary. Minneapolis: University of Minnesota Press (2010). 
To the other shore: Lalla's life and poetry. Hillsboro Beach: Vitasta (1999). 
Mystical Verses of Lalla. Delhi: Motilal Banarsidass (2009). 
Lalla to Nuruddin: Rishi-Sufi Poetry of Kashmir. Delhi: Motilal Banarsidass (2013).

References

External links
Homepage 

Living people
American women writers of Indian descent
University of Hawaiʻi faculty
American women philosophers
21st-century Indian philosophers
Kashmiri writers
American people of Kashmiri descent
American academics of Indian descent
21st-century Indian chemists
21st-century Indian women scientists
Indian women philosophers
American women non-fiction writers
21st-century American women writers
Year of birth missing (living people)
Indian scholars
Electronic literature writers